Paul Kevin Rugg (born October 21, 1960) is an American screenwriter, producer, voice actor, and puppeteer.

Biography
Rugg has worked extensively in the field of animation. His list of credits include writing for, co-producing, and playing the voices of several cartoon characters, first being credited as "Mr. Director" (a Jerry Lewis-esque character) from Steven Spielberg Presents Animaniacs. Afterwards, he voiced the title character in Steven Spielberg Presents Freakazoid and the Histeria portrayal of Nostradamus, as well as the main recurring villain, the Dark Lord Chuckles The Silly Piggy in the Disney series Dave the Barbarian. Recently, he has provided the voice of Gweelok for Cartoon Network's Secret Mountain Fort Awesome.

Rugg also appeared live as the eccentric character "Manny" in the Manny the Uncanny short segments as part of Disney's One Saturday Morning for ABC.

Rugg created and directed The Sam Plenty Cavalcade of Action Show Plus Singing with Mitch Schauer, on behalf of The Jim Henson Company. He also played the voice of Principal Rotwood in the Disney Channel Original series American Dragon Jake Long.

Rugg was once—along with Adam Carolla and John P. McCann (his co-producer on Freakazoid)—an improvisational actor at the Acme Comedy Theatre in Los Angeles, where he created the character Manny the Uncanny.

Rugg was recruited to the Warner Bros. Television Animation team headed up by Jean MacCurdy and Tom Ruegger and was a key contributor to their various series in the 1990s. Rugg recently moderated a panel about some of the classic series produced during this time at Comic-Con in 2008. (Participants included Paul Dini, Jean MacCurdy, John P. McCann, and Andrea Romano).

Paul Rugg later worked with Brian Henson when he took up puppeteer work for Puppet Up and other projects of The Jim Henson Company under its "Henson Alternative" banner. He reunited with Brian Henson as puppet talk show host Ned on the Disney+ talk show Earth To Ned. 

Rugg has been nominated for several Emmys, and has received three. He lives up the coast from Los Angeles with his wife Maria and daughter.

Filmography

Television
 American Dragon: Jake Long – Professor Rotwood
 Animaniacs – Mr. Director, Mr. Clown, Additional Voices
 Buzz Lightyear of Star Command – Cosmo, Ed the Courier
 Cleopatra in Space – Dr. Queed
 Disney's One Saturday Morning – Manny the Uncanny, Alistair Flyndiggery and Vanessa
 Dave the Barbarian – The Dark Lord Chuckles the Silly Piggy
 DreamWorks Dragons – Savage
 Earth to Ned - Ned
 Freakazoid – Freakazoid, Paul Harvey
 Histeria – Nostradamus, Charles Darwin, Eli Whitney, Merriwether Lewis, Montezuma, Qinshihuangdi, Sergei Eisenstein
 Kung Fu Panda: Legends of Awesomeness – Master Yao
 OK KO! Let's Be Heroes – President of the Universe, Cantalop
 Oddballs – Dr. Bolster
 Pig Goat Banana Cricket – Cricket
 Pinky and the Brain – Sultana Sultana
 Scooby-Doo! Mystery Incorporated – Dr. Luis de Potrillo
 Secret Mountain Fort Awesome – Gweelok
 The Fairly OddParents – Grim Reaper (Ep. "Man's Worst Friend")
 Teen Titans Go! – Freakazoid
 The 7D – Lord Starchbottom
 The Adventures of Puss in Boots – Artephius
 The Epic Tales of Captain Underpants − Vert Ladderfeller III / Altitooth / Bivouac Ladderfeller
 Toonsylvania – Seth Tuber's Mother, Reporter
 The Cartoonstitute – Bacculas (ep. Meddlen Meddows)
 The Mighty Ones – Flippy
 My Science Fiction Project – Chancellor Maniac
 We Bare Bears – Mr. Howard

Film
 The Ant Bully – Ant #5
 The Country Bears – TV Reporter
 Wakko's Wish – Mr. Director
 Scooby-Doo! Stage Fright – Steve Trilby

Video games
 EverQuest II – Calig Shauwls, Captain Ganwail, Dailin Blainin, Drammer Quickblade, Haunt of Solusek Mines, Lord Fannos Stormhelm
 Hitman: Blood Money – Additional Voices
 Xiaolin Showdown – Dojo Kanojo Cho

Webisodes
 Alt/Reality – Various
 Puppet for President – Marvin E. Quasniki
 Simian Undercover Detective Squad – Captain Marion Futz

Miscellaneous
 Puppet Up! – Himself, Various
 Nostalgia Critic – Himself

Crew work
 Animaniacs – Story Editor, Writer
 Freakazoid – Writer
 The Penguins of Madagascar – Writer
 Kung Fu Panda: Legends of Awesomeness – Writer
 Pac-Man and the Ghostly Adventures – Developer, Writer
 Scooby-Doo! Mystery Incorporated – Writer
 The Looney Tunes Show – Writer
 The Sam Plenty Cavalcade of Action Show Plus Singing! – Creator, Director
 Tiny Toon Adventures – Writer
 Toonsylvania – Creative Consultant
 The 7D – Writer

External links
 Paul Rugg's blog
 Sam Plenty
 

1960 births
Living people
20th-century American male actors
21st-century American male actors
Male actors from California
American film producers
American male voice actors
American television writers
American puppeteers
American male television writers